The 2015 Wan Chai District Council election was held on 22 November 2015 to elect all 15 members to the Wan Chai District Council.

The pro-Beijing camp remained control of the council with the Democratic Alliance for the Betterment and Progress of Hong Kong retained the largest party status with three seats. In Tai Hang, "Umbrella soldier" Claris Yeung Suet-ying who, inspired by the 2014 Hong Kong protests, took a seat from New People's Party.

Overall election results
Before election:

Change in composition:

Results by constituency

Broadwood

Canal Road

Causeway Bay

Happy Valley

Hennessy

Jardine's Lookout

Oi Kwan

Southorn

Stubbs Road

Tai Fat Hau

Tai Hang

Tin Hau

Victoria Park

References

2015 Hong Kong local elections
Wan Chai District Council elections